Whitesville can refer to a place in the United States:

 Whitesville, Georgia
 Whitesville, Indiana
 Whitesville, Kentucky
 Whitesville, Missouri
 Whitesville, Monmouth County, New Jersey
 Whitesville, Ocean County, New Jersey
 Whitesville, New York
 Whitesville, West Virginia